Dreamweapon: An Evening of Contemporary Sitar Music is a 1990 live album by Spacemen 3.

Overview
The title track is from a live performance at Watermans Arts Centre in Brentford, London, on August 19, 1988.  Peter Kember, Jason Pierce, Will Carruthers, and Steve Evans played.  The piece was inspired by drone music, with a text from its 1960s originator La Monte Young in the liner notes.
The liner notes for this track credit Pat Fish, a.k.a. the Jazz Butcher, with "joint rolling."

The other track on the original vinyl release "Ecstasy in Slow Motion" is a studio performance from 1987 which only features Pete Kember. It does not feature on the original CD. "Spacemen Jam", which appears on subsequent reissues, is Peter Kember and an unknown second guitarist, possibly Jason Pierce. Jason is credited in the sleeve notes on the Sympathy for the Record Industry reissue. The track on the vinyl release plays backwards- from the centre outwards.

Dreamweapon is the creation of Angus MacLise the original drummer for the Velvet Underground and collaborator with experimental contributors including musician La Monte Young, filmmaker Jack Smith ("Flaming Creatures"), and poet Ira Cohen.

The Guardian printed an extract from Will Carruthers' memoir about his recollection of the recording of the album.

Track listing
Original release (Fierce)

CD copies contain only "An Evening of Contemporary Sitar Music (Full Length Version)"

1993 re-issue (Sympathy for the Record Industry)

2004 re-issue (Space Age Recordings)

References

1995 live albums
Spacemen 3 albums
Sympathy for the Record Industry live albums